The Last Supper is an opera with music by Sir Harrison Birtwistle to an English and Latin libretto by Robin Blaser.  Birtwistle composed the music over the period written in 1998-1999.  The world premiere was given by the Berlin State Opera on 18 April 2000, with the production directed by Martin Duncan and conducted by Daniel Barenboim.  It was subsequently performed by the Glyndebourne Touring Opera in October/November 2000 and the following summer at the 2001 Glyndebourne Festival. Many of the original cast returned for two concert performances at the Piccolo Teatro Studio Expo, Milan and the Teatro Valdocco, Turin on 4–5 September 2008 with the London Sinfonietta, conducted by Elgar Howarth as part of the Settembre Musica festival.

Roles
 Christ (baritone) 
 Judas (tenor)
 Ghost (soprano)
 Little James (countertenor)
 James (countertenor)
 Thomas (tenor)
 Andrew (tenor)
 Simon (tenor)
 Bartholomew (tenor)
 Philip (baritone)
 John (baritone)
 Matthew (bass-baritone)
 Thaddeus (bass)
 Peter (bass)

Choral parts
 Chorus Mysticus (amplified); 3 sopranos, 3 mezzo-sopranos, 3 altos
 Chorus Resonus (pre-recorded); 3 sopranos, 3 mezzo-sopranos, 3 altos
 Chorus in Visions I-III (pre-recorded); 3 sopranos, 3 mezzo-sopranos, 3 altos, 3 tenors, 3 baritones, 3 basses

Original cast
 Christ: William Dazeley
 Judas: Tom Randle
 Ghost: Susan Bickley
 Little James: Stephen Wallace
 James: Andrew Watts
 Thomas: Michael Hart-Davis
 Andrew: Colin Judson
 Simon: Hilton Marlton
 Bartholomew: Christopher Lemmings
 Philip: Adrian Powter
 John: Andrew Rupp
 Matthew: Paul Reeves
 Thaddeus: Simon Kirkbride
 Peter: Geoffrey Moses

Synopsis

The story is a contemporary retelling of the "Last Supper" story.  It involves a character (Ghost) who represents ourselves/the audience.  Ghost invites Christ and his disciples to supper.  The ensuing drama juxtaposes the old and new, Jewish and Christian to raise questions about the myth/story of the Last Supper and its meaning in our modern context.  The opera ends in the Garden of Olives with Christ asking, "Whom do you seek?" and then a cock crows.

References

External links
 Boosey & Hawkes page on the opera
 Matthew Rogers, on-line essay on Glyndebourne performance of the opera

Operas by Harrison Birtwistle
English-language operas
Operas
2000 operas
Opera world premieres at the Berlin State Opera
Operas based on the Bible
Operas based on real people
Operas set in the 1st century
Depictions of Jesus in music
Latin-language operas
Last Supper
Multiple-language operas